A bronze sculpture depicting late Soundgarden vocalist Chris Cornell (called Chris Cornell in Performance) is installed outside Seattle's Museum of Pop Culture, in the U.S. state of Washington. The statue was created by sculptor and special effects artist Nick Marra. It was first displayed to the public on October 7, 2018. The life-size statue shows the musician holding a guitar. It was donated to the museum in by Cornell's widow, Vicky Cornell.

The statue was vandalized in August 2020.

See also

 2018 in art

References

2018 establishments in Washington (state)
2018 sculptures
Bronze sculptures in Washington (state)
Chris Cornell
Cultural depictions of American men
Cultural depictions of rock musicians
Monuments and memorials in Seattle
Outdoor sculptures in Seattle
Sculptures of men in Washington (state)
Seattle Center
Soundgarden
Statues in Seattle
Statues of musicians in the United States
Vandalized works of art in Washington (state)